Ilfjellet is a mountain in the municipality of Rennebu in Trøndelag county, Norway.

Name
The mountain is named after the river Ila.  The last element is the finite form of fjell which means "fell" or "mountain". The river name is derived from Old Norse íla which means "spring".

References

Rennebu
Mountains of Trøndelag